Il... Belpaese (Italian for "The... Beautiful Country") is a 1977 black comedy film written and directed by Luciano Salce and starring Paolo Villaggio and  Silvia Dionisio.

Plot 
Guido Berardinelli is an unfortunate tanker man, returned to Italy after eight years of work on an oil platform in Persian gulf. Guido doesn't knows nothing of the social movement in Italy of the '70s, especially in Milan, and so when arrives, he discovers that his "beautiful country" (BelpaesE) is a total disaster! However, Guido tries to live within the law, opening a watch store, but he is constantly being targeted by the Mafia...

Cast 
 
 Paolo Villaggio as Guido Berardinelli
 Silvia Dionisio as  Mia
 Anna Mazzamauro as Miss Gruber
 Pino Caruso as  Ovidio Camorrà
 Gigi Reder as  Alfredo 
 Giuliana Calandra as  Elena
 Massimo Boldi as Carletto
  Raffaele Curi as  Spadozza
 Ugo Bologna as The Bank Director
  Leo Gavero  as The Jeweler
 Tom Felleghy as  Andrea
  Carla Mancini as  Lisetta

References

External links

Italian satirical films
1970s black comedy films
Films directed by Luciano Salce
Italian black comedy films
1977 comedy films
1977 films
1970s Italian-language films
1970s Italian films